Gnaphalium pilulare is a species of flowering plant belonging to the family Asteraceae.

Its native range is Northern Europe to Japan.

References

pilulare